Harpalus hatchi is a species of ground beetle in the subfamily Harpalinae. It was described by Ball & Anderson in 1962.

References

hatchi
Beetles described in 1962